Mae Wong is a district (amphoe) in the western part of Nakhon Sawan province, central Thailand.

History
The minor district (king amphoe) Mae Wong was created on 1 April 1992, when the six tambons: Mae Wong, Mae Le, Wang San, Khao Chon Kan, Pang Sawan, and Huai Nam Hom were split off from Lat Yao district. Huai Nam Hom was returned to Lat Yai District on 1 December 1994. On 11 October 1997 the minor district was upgraded to a full district.

Geography
Mae Wong is the name of the river in Mae Wong National Park.

Neighboring districts are (from the north clockwise): Pang Sila Thong and Khanu Woralaksaburi of Kamphaeng Phet province, Lat Yao, Chum Ta Bong, and Mae Poen of Nakhon Sawan Province, and Umphang of Tak province.

Administration
The district is divided into four sub-districts (tambons), which are further subdivided into 67 villages (mubans). There are no municipal (thesaban) areas and a further four tambon administrative organizations (TAO).

See also
Mae Wong Dam

References

External links
amphoe.com

Mae Wong